The 2010 season was the San Diego Chargers' 41st in the National Football League and their 51st overall. The team failed to improve on their 13–3 record the previous season, finishing with a 9–7 record and missing the playoffs for the first time since 2005.

The 2010 Chargers are noted for having both the No. 1-ranked offense and defense, the first team to do so since the 1996 Green Bay Packers. However, a struggling special teams unit would help cause the Chargers to lose five of their first seven games, each of which was by a one-possession margin. The San Diego Union-Tribune wrote "[N]o team even came close to having all those special teams foibles in one season." Football Outsiders calculated that the Chargers had the worst special teams in the league in 2010 and the fifth-worst from 1993 to 2010. Although the Chargers won seven of their nine remaining matchups, they were unable to overcome the slow start and missed the postseason by one game. An additional victory would have allowed the Chargers to win the AFC West on a tiebreaker, but they instead finished a game behind the Kansas City Chiefs.

In addition to their statistical performance, the Chargers used an NFL-record tying 74 players during the season due to injuries. The 2010 season also saw the Chargers have their first home blackouts since 2004 and was their first since 2000 to not have future Hall of Fame running back LaDainian Tomlinson on the roster.

Offseason
On February 22, 2010, LaDainian Tomlinson requested his release after nine seasons with the team, and went to the New York Jets.

2010 NFL Draft

After finishing the season with the best record among teams exiting the playoffs in the divisional round, the Chargers picked 28th in the draft. They traded their sixth round pick in a trade that sent defensive tackle Travis Johnson to the Chargers.

Draft notes

Coaching staff

Final roster

Schedule

Preseason

Regular season

Standings

Regular season results

Week 1: at Kansas City Chiefs

The Chargers began their season at Arrowhead Stadium for a division rivalry match against the Kansas City Chiefs. In the first quarter the Chargers took the early lead as QB Philip Rivers completed a 3-yard TD pass to TE Antonio Gates. The Chiefs replied when RB Jamaal Charles made a 56-yard TD run. In the 2nd quarter the Chargers fell behind when QB Matt Cassel completed a 2-yard TD pass to TE Tony Moeaki. This was followed by WR Dexter McCluster returning a punt 94 yards to the endzone for a touchdown. In the third quarter the Chargers cut the lead when QB Philip Rivers threw a 59-yard TD pass to WR Legedu Naanee. In the 4th quarter the Chiefs defense prevented any more scoring from the Chargers.

With the loss, San Diego began at 0–1.

Week 2: vs. Jacksonville Jaguars

Hoping to rebound from their loss to the Chiefs, the Chargers returned home for an AFC duel with the Jaguars. In the 1st quarter, San Diego took the early lead as FB Mike Tolbert made a 2-yard TD run. The Jaguars replied with kicker Josh Scobee hitting a 44-yard field goal. The Chargers increased their lead as QB Philip Rivers completed a 9-yard TD pass to TE Antonio Gates. The Jaguars tried to cut the lead with Scobee nailing a 48-yard field goal. The Chargers continued to score with Rivers making a 4-yard TD pass to Gates; followed in the 3rd quarter by kicker Nate Kaeding getting a 41-yard field goal. In the 4th quarter the Chargers continued to dominate with FB Mike Tolbert getting a 1-yard TD run, followed by Rivers completing a 54-yard TD pass to WR Malcolm Floyd. The lead was slightly narrowed when QB David Garrard made a 3-yard TD pass to WR Mike Sims-Walker.

With the win, the Chargers improved to 1–1.

Week 3: at Seattle Seahawks
 Coming off their win over the Jaguars the Chargers flew to Qwest Field where they played their former division rival, the Seattle Seahawks. In the second quarter San Diego trailed early when kicker Olindo Mare made a 23-yard field goal. Then QB Matt Hasselbeck completed a 9-yard TD pass to TE John Carlson. This was followed in the third quarter by RB Leon Washington returning a kickoff 101 yards to the endzone for a touchdown. The Chargers cut the lead with QB Philip Rivers getting a 3-yard TD pass to WR Malcolm Floyd, followed by Hasselbeck getting sacked by ILB Brandon Siler in the endzone for a safety. Then kicker Nate Kaeding made a 29-yard field goal. The Seahawks increased their lead when Mare made a 23-yard field goal, but the Chargers replied and tied the game when Rivers found TE Antonio Gates on a 12-yard TD pass. (With a successful 2-point conversion as Rivers found WR Legedu Naanee). Before the clock struck zero Seattle took the winning score as RB Leon Washington returned his second kickoff of the game into the endzone running 99 yards for a touchdown, giving the Chargers the loss.

With the loss, San Diego fell to 1–2.

Week 4: vs. Arizona Cardinals

Hoping to rebound from their loss to the Seahawks the Chargers played on home ground for an inter-conference duel with the Cardinals. In the 1st quarter the Chargers took the early lead as QB Philip Rivers completed a 33-yard TD pass to TE Antonio Gates, but had a problem maintaining this lead in the 2nd quarter when FS Kerry Rhodes recovered a fumble and ran 2 yards to the endzone for a touchdown. After that, the Chargers went on a scoring rally with FB Mike Tolbert making a 5-yard TD run, followed by Rivers making a 26-yard TD pass to TE Antonio Gates. Then OLB Shaun Phillips successfully caught an interception and ran 31 yards to the endzone for a touchdown. This was followed in the 3rd quarter by kicker Nate Kaeding making a 48-yard field goal. Then RB Ryan Mathews got a 15-yard TD run. This was followed in the 4th quarter by Kaeding nailing a 47-yard field goal. The Cardinals tried to cut the lead, but only came away with kicker Jay Feely's 53-yard field goal.

With the win, San Diego improved to 2–2.

Week 5: at Oakland Raiders

Coming off their win over the Cardinals the Chargers flew to Oakland–Alameda County Coliseum for an AFC West division rivalry match against the Raiders. In the first quarter the Chargers' offense had problems when after a three-and-out Mike Scifres' punt was blocked by RB Rock Cartwright out of bounds in the end zone for a safety. Then kicker Sebastian Janikowski made a 50-yard field goal. Then Scifres' punt was blocked again and returned by FS Hiram Eugene 5 yards to the endzone for a touchdown. The Chargers then fought back and took the lead with QB Philip Rivers completing a 19-yard TD pass to TE Antonio Gates. Then RB Mike Tolbert got a 4-yard TD run. Then the Chargers trailed with Janikowski making a 30-yard field goal. But they responded and got the lead back with kicker Nate Kaeding making a 43-yard field goal, followed in the third quarter by Rivers making a 41-yard TD pass to WR Malcolm Floyd. The Raiders replied with QB Jason Campbell completing a 1-yard TD pass to TE Zach Miller. Followed in the 4th quarter by Kaeding making a 34-yard field goal. The Chargers fell behind when RB Michael Bush got a 3-yard touchdown run (with a failed 2-point conversion), followed by SS Tyvon Branch recovering a fumble and running 64 yards to the endzone for a touchdown to give the Chargers a loss, for the first time against the Raiders since 2003.

With the loss, San Diego fell to 2–3 for the 4th straight season.

Week 6: at St. Louis Rams

Hoping to rebound from their loss to the Raiders the Chargers flew to Edward Jones Dome for an Interconference duel with the Rams. In the first quarter San Diego trailed early as kicker Josh Brown made a 39-yard field goal, followed by QB Sam Bradford completing a 38-yard TD pass to WR Danario Alexander. The Chargers struggled further in the 2nd quarter when RB Steven Jackson got a 7-yard TD run. The Chargers replied with kicker Nate Kaeding nailing a 41-yard field goal, followed in the third quarter by FB Mike Tolbert getting a 1-yard TD run. In the 4th quarter the Rams' lead increased when Josh Brown hit a 48-yard field goal, but was cut when QB Philip Rivers made a 5-yard TD pass to WR Buster Davis.

With the loss, San Diego fell to 2–4 and surpassed their 2009 loss total.

Week 7: vs. New England Patriots

Hoping to break their current losing streak the Chargers played on home ground for an AFC duel with the Patriots. In the 1st quarter the Chargers took the lead as kicker Kris Brown made a 32-yard field goal, but they fell behind with QB Tom Brady making a 1-yard TD pass to TE Rob Gronkowski; followed in the second quarter by kicker Stephen Gostkowski getting a 40 and a 35-yard field goal. In the third quarter the Chargers continued to struggle with RB BenJarvus Green-Ellis getting a 1-yard TD run. In the fourth quarter the Chargers replied with Brown making a 28-yard field goal, but the Patriots continued to score with a 35-yard field goal from Gostkowski. The Chargers tried to cut the lead with QB Philip Rivers making a 4-yard TD pass to TE Antonio Gates, and with FB Mike Tolbert making a 1-yard TD run, but the Chargers got called for false start which turned a 45yd FG into a 50yd, and Kris Brown missed on the final play.

With the loss, San Diego fell to 2–5.

Week 8: vs. Tennessee Titans

Hoping to break their current losing streak the Chargers played on home ground for an AFC duel with the Titans. In the first quarter the Chargers trailed early when the Chargers' punt was blocked by Nick Schommer out of bounds for a safety. The Chargers replied with FB Mike Tolbert getting a 1-yard TD run. The Chargers fell behind with kicker Rob Bironas nailing a 21-yard field goal, followed in the second quarter by QB Vince Young completing a 1-yard TD pass to TE Craig Stevens. The Chargers struggled further with RB Chris Johnson getting a 29-yard TD run. The Chargers then went on a scoring rally with RB Ryan Mathews making a 7-yard TD run, followed in the third quarter by kicker Kris Brown making a 34-yard field goal. Then QB Philip Rivers completed a 48-yard TD pass to TE Antonio Gates, and then Brown made a 36-yard field goal. The lead was narrowed with Young finding WR Nate Washington on a 71-yard TD pass (with a failed 2-point conversion), but couldn't do anything after Rivers got a 13-yard TD pass to RB Darren Sproles (PAT aborted).

With the win, the Chargers improve to 3–5.

Week 9: at Houston Texans

Hoping to increase their winning streak the Chargers moved to Reliant Stadium for an AFC duel with the Texans. In the first quarter the Chargers trailed early as RB Arian Foster got an 8-yard TD run. They soon replied with QB Philip Rivers making a 55-yard TD pass to WR Seyi Ajirotutu. They trailed again with kicker Neil Rackers nailed a 27-yard field goal, but took the lead after Rivers got an 11-yard TD pass to TE Randy McMichael. They fell behind again in the second quarter as Foster made a 2-yard TD run, followed by Rackers hitting a 21 and a 25-yard field goal. The Chargers eventually pulled themselves in front again, with Rivers finding McMichael again on a 12-yard TD pass. This was followed in the 4th quarter by Rivers' 28-yard TD pass to Ajirotutu (With a successful 2-point conversion as FB Mike Tolbert ran to the endzone).

With the win, the Chargers went into their bye week at 4–5.

Week 11: Denver Broncos

Coming off their bye week, the Chargers went home for a Week 11 AFC West duel with the Denver Broncos on Monday night. San Diego trailed early in the first quarter as Broncos running back Knowshon Moreno got a 4-yard touchdown run. The Chargers answered with quarterback Philip Rivers finding wide receiver Malcolm Floyd on a 6-yard touchdown pass. San Diego took the lead in the second quarter with a 1-yard touchdown run from fullback Mike Tolbert, followed by Rivers finding wide receiver Patrick Crayton on a 40-yard touchdown pass.

The Chargers added onto their lead in the third quarter as Rivers connected with running back Darren Sproles on a 57-yard touchdown pass. San Diego continued its dominating night with Rivers' 3-yard touchdown pass to fullback Jacob Hester. Denver would close out the game with quarterback Kyle Orton completing a 13-yard touchdown pass to wide receiver Brandon Lloyd.

With the win, the Chargers improved to 5–5.

Week 12: at Indianapolis Colts

The Chargers' eleventh game was an AFC duel against the Colts at Lucas Oil Stadium. They trailed early in the first quarter after QB Peyton Manning made a 4-yard TD pass to TE Jacob Tamme. They eventually pulled ahead after kicker Nate Kaeding made a 28-yard field goal, followed by ILB Kevin Burnett returning an interception 29 yards for a touchdown, and then with Kaeding hitting a 33 and a 50-yard field goal. Their lead was narrowed when Manning made a 6-yard TD pass to WR Blair White, but the Chargers controlled the second half with Kaeding getting a 30-yard field goal, which was shortly followed by FS Eric Weddle returning an interception 41 yards for a touchdown, then with FB Mike Tolbert getting a 3-yard TD run, and Kaeding making a 20-yard field goal, settling both teams records to 6–5.

Week 13: vs. Oakland Raiders

Coming off their win over the Colts the Chargers played on home ground for a rematch against the Raiders. The Chargers trailed early as QB Jason Campbell scrambled 9 yards for a touchdown, followed by his 4-yard TD pass to WR Jacoby Ford. They replied in the second quarter as kicker Nate Kaeding nailed a 39-yard field goal, but trailed further with RB Michael Bush getting a 7-yard TD run. The Chargers cut the lead with Kaeding hitting a 33-yard field goal, followed by QB Philip Rivers completing a 4-yard TD pass to TE Antonio Gates. The Raiders would finish off with Darren McFadden making a 7-yard TD run.

With the loss, San Diego fell to 6–6 and were swept by the Raiders for the first time since 2001.

Week 14: vs. Kansas City Chiefs

Hoping to rebound from their loss to the Raiders the Chargers played on home ground for an AFC West rivalry rematch against the Chiefs. The Chargers took control of the game with QB Philip Rivers throwing a 17-yard TD pass to WR Malcolm Floyd, followed by FB Mike Tolbert getting an 8-yard TD run. The lead was increased with Rivers finding Floyd again on a 9-yard TD pass. This was followed in the fourth quarter by kicker Nate Kaeding nailing a 48-yard field goal, and then by RB Ryan Mathews getting a 15-yard TD run.

With the shutout win over Kansas City, San Diego improved to 7–6.

Week 15: vs. San Francisco 49ers

The Chargers' fourteenth game was an interconference duel with the 49ers which was played on Thursday Night. The Chargers took a quick lead with QB Philip Rivers throwing a 58-yard TD pass to WR Vincent Jackson. The lead was extended in the second quarter by kicker Nate Kaeding nailing a 25-yard field goal, followed by Rivers finding Jackson on an 11-yard touchdown pass. The Chargers continued to dominate with FB Mike Tolbert getting a 1-yard TD run, followed by Rivers connecting to Jackson on a 48-yard TD pass, then with Kaeding hitting a 39-yard field goal. The 49ers made their only score of the game with RB Brian Westbrook getting a 1-yard TD run.

This game was also a blowout and San Diego improved to 8–6.

Week 16: at Cincinnati Bengals

Hoping to make it three straight the Chargers flew to Paul Brown Stadium for an AFC duel with the Bengals. In the first quarter the Chargers trailed early with QB Carson Palmer throwing a 3-yard TD pass to TE Jermaine Gresham. Then Palmer found WR Jerome Simpson on a 10-yard TD pass (PAT failed, wide left). The Chargers got on the board with kicker Nate Kaeding hitting a 20-yard field goal, followed by RB Ryan Mathews getting a 23-yard TD run, but went into more trouble as Palmer completed a 3-yard TD pass to WR Jordan Shipley. The Chargers cut the lead with Kaeding making a 28-yard field goal, but struggled to hold on after Palmer connected to Simpson on a 59-yard TD pass, followed by RB Bernard Scott getting a 10-yard TD run. The Chargers tried to come back after QB Philip Rivers made a 5-yard TD pass to WR Kelley Washington, but the Bengals defense prevented any more scoring chances.

With the loss, the Chargers fell to 8–7. With Kansas City winning earlier in the day, the loss prevented the Chargers from making their sixth playoff appearance in seven years.

Week 17: at Denver Broncos

The Chargers' final game was a division rivalry rematch against the Broncos. In the first quarter the Chargers trailed early as QB Tim Tebow threw a 14-yard TD pass to WR Brandon Lloyd. They eventually overcame this deficit with RB Ryan Mathews getting a 27-yard TD run, followed by kicker Nate Kaeding nailing a 42, 45 and 47-yard field goal to put the Chargers up 16–7. They extended their lead in the third quarter with Mathews getting a 12-yard TD run, followed by Kaeding hitting a 37-yard field goal. The lead was narrowed with QB Tim Tebow completing a 6-yard TD pass to WR Eric Decker, but the Chargers increased their lead with Mathews getting a 31-yard TD run. The lead was narrowed further with Cassius Vaughn returning the kickoff 97 yards for a touchdown, followed by Tebow scrambling 6 yards for a touchdown, but the Chargers still managed to hold on for the win. The Chargers finished the 2010–11 NFL season as the only team ever to rank first in overall offense (396 yds/g) and overall defense (272 yds/g), in terms of total yards gained and allowed, and not make the playoffs the same year. Since 1970 the previous four NFL teams to accomplish that statistical feat all qualified for the post-season in those respective years.

With the win against the Broncos, San Diego finished with a 9–7 record.

Legacy 
In 2019 SB Nation deemed the 2010 Chargers to be one of the greatest NFL teams of all time, despite missing the playoffs, if the special teams unit was excluded.

Notes and references

External links

 2011 San Diego Chargers Media Guide 
 Team schedule on NFL.com
 Chargers 2010 Draft selections on NFL.com

San Diego
San Diego Chargers seasons
San Diego